FK Lokomotiva (Serbian Cyrillic: ФК Лoкoмoтивa Бpчкo) is a football club based in Brčko, Bosnia and Herzegovina.

It competes in the Second League of the Republika Srpska.

History

Notable former coaches
   Savo Obradović
   Dragiša Krajšumović

External links
 FK Lokomotiva official website 
 Club at BiHsoccer.

Football clubs in Bosnia and Herzegovina
Football clubs in Republika Srpska
Association football clubs established in 1948
1948 establishments in Bosnia and Herzegovina
Brčko District